The 2016 United States House of Representatives election in South Dakota was held on November 8, 2016, to elect the U.S. representative from South Dakota's at-large congressional district, who would represent the state of South Dakota in the 115th United States Congress. The election coincided with the 2016 U.S. presidential election, as well as other elections to the House of Representatives, elections to the United States Senate and various state and local elections. The primaries were held on June 7.

Incumbent Republican Kristi Noem won re-election.

Republican primary

Candidates

Declared
 Kristi Noem, incumbent U.S. Representative

Democratic primary

Candidates

Declared
 Paula Hawks, South Dakota State Representative

General election

Polling

Results

See also

 United States House of Representatives elections, 2016
 United States elections, 2016

References

External links
Official campaign websites (Archived)
Paula Hawks for Congress
Kristi Noem for Congress

South Dakota
2016
United States House